The Khmuic languages  are a branch of the Austroasiatic languages spoken mostly in northern Laos, as well as in neighboring northern Vietnam and southern Yunnan, China. Khmu is the only widely spoken language in the group.

Homeland
Paul Sidwell (2015) suggests that the Khmuic Urheimat (homeland) was in what is now Oudomxay Province, northern Laos.

Languages
The Khmuic languages are:

Mlabri (Yumbri)
Kniang (Phong 3, Tay Phong)
Ksingmul (Puok, Pou Hok, Khsing-Mul)
Khmu’
Khuen
O’du
Prai
Mal (Thin)
Theen (Kha Sam Liam)

There is some disagreement over whether Bit is Khmuic or Palaungic; Svantesson believes it is most likely Palaungic, and it is sometimes placed in Mangic, but most classifications here take them as Khmuic. Similarly, Phuoc (Xinh Mul) and Kháng are also sometimes classified as Mangic, and Kháng is classified as Palaungic by Diffloth.

The recently discovered Bumang language is also likely a Khmuic or Palaungic language. Jerold A. Edmondson considers it to be most closely related to Khang. Also, Quang Lam is a poorly attested language in Vietnam that may be closely related to Kháng or Bit.

Classification
The interrelationships of these languages are uncertain. Ethnologue 19 classifies them as follows:

Khmuic
Khao: Khao, Bit
Mlabri: Mlabri
Xinh Mul: Khang, Phong-Kniang, Puoc
Mal–Khmu’
Khmu’, Khuen, O’du
Mal–Phrai: Lua’, Mal, Prai

A provisional classification at SEALang keeps Mal–Phrai, but connects Khao with Khang instead of with Bit, treats Khuen as a dialect of Khmu':

Khmuic
Bit
Khao–Khang: Khao, Khang
Mlabri
Phong
Puoc
Khmu’
O’du
Mal–Phrai: Lua’, Mal, Phray, Phai

Diffloth & Proschan (1989)
Chazée (1999), citing Diffloth & Proschan (1989), has the following:

Khmuic
(Khang?)
Khmu
Phray–Pram
Mlabri
Phay/Mal/T'in
(Branch)Ksing Moul (Ksongmul)PramicTai Hat (Iduh)Tai ThenPhong Laan, Phong Phène, Phong TapouangKaniang, Phong Piat, (Phong Saloey)However, Gérard Diffloth now considers Pramic (i.e., all Khmuic languages except for Khmu) to be a separate Austroasiatic branch that has come under heavy influence from Khmu.

Peiros (2004)
Ilia Peiros (Peiros 2004:39) gives the following classification:

Khmuic
(Branch)KhangBit(Branch)
Mlabri–PrayMlabriPray(Branch)Kmu(Branch)Kxinh MulKsinmul(Branch)Phong-KniangIduhSidwell (2014)
Based on developments of Proto-Khmuic *aː₁, Paul Sidwell (2014) classifies the Khmuic languages as follows.

KhmuicKhmuMlabri-PramMlabriPhay-PramPhay/Mal/T'inKhsing MulPramicTai HatPhong Laan, Phong Phène, Phong TapouangKniang, Phong Piat, (Phong Saloey)TaytenThe developments of Proto-Khmuic *aː₁ according to Sidwell (2014) are:
Proto-Khmuic: *aː₁
Khmu: *aː
Proto-Mlabri-Pram: *ɛː
Proto-Pray-Pram: *iə
Proto-Pramic *iː

See also
Khmu language
Khmu people

References

 Further reading 
Chazée, Laurent. 1999. The Peoples of Laos: Rural and Ethnic Diversities. Bangkok: White Lotus.
Cheeseman, Nathaniel; Paul Sidwell and Anne Osborne. 2017. Khmuic Linguistic Bibliography with Selected Annotations. JSEALS vol. 10 issue 1. pages i-xlvi.
Filbeck, David. 1978. T’in: a historical study. Pacifĳic Linguistics Series B-49. Canberra: Australian National University. [Includes a reconstruction of Proto-T’inic]
Peiros, Ilia J. 2004. Geneticeskaja klassifikacija aystroaziatskix jazykov. Moskva: Rossijskij gosudarstvennyj gumanitarnyj universitet (doktorskaja dissertacija).
Sidwell, Paul. 2014. "Khmuic classification and homeland". Mon-Khmer Studies'' 43.1:47-56

External links 
RWAAI (Repository and Workspace for Austroasiatic Intangible Heritage)
The Kammu Project (Lund University)
http://hdl.handle.net/10050/00-0000-0000-0003-66E8-9@view Khmuic languages in RWAAI Digital Archive